The 2022–23 UT Arlington Mavericks men's basketball team represented the University of Texas at Arlington in the 2022–23 NCAA Division I men's basketball season. The Mavericks, led by second-year head coach Greg Young, played their home games at the College Park Center in Arlington, Texas as members of the Western Athletic Conference.

Previous season
The Mavericks finished the 2021–22 season 11–18, 7–10 in Sun Belt play to finish in ninth place. In the Sun Belt tournament, they lost in the first round to Louisiana. This was their last season as members of the Sun Belt Conference, as they returned to the Western Athletic Conference for the first time since the 2012–13 season, their only prior season as a WAC member.

Roster

Schedule and results

|-
!colspan=12 style=| Non-conference regular season

|-
!colspan=12 style=| WAC regular season

|-
!colspan=9 style=| WAC tournament

Sources

References

UT Arlington Mavericks men's basketball seasons
UT Arlington Mavericks
UT Arlington Mavericks men's basketball
UT Arlington Mavericks men's basketball